is a series of seal characters created by the Japanese company San-X. The prefix mame, meaning bean in Japanese, is used to refer to miniature versions of things; the suffix goma is an abbreviation of gomafuazarashi, or sesame seed-mottled seal, which is the Japanese name for the spotted seal.

Mamegoma are available in a variety of different colors including, white, blue, pink, yellow, and black. The seals are often depicted as being small enough (12 cm, weighing around 200 g) to live in a common goldfish bowl, usually with a few ice cubes to keep the water nice and cool. They are also shown in advertisements and merchandise in bath tubs and relaxing on a wheel in a hamster cage among other activities.

The mamegoma characters are available as plush toys from UFO catcher machines. There are also many different products with the Mamegoma seals as a decoration, like stationery, calendars etc.

Media
The 2009 anime  is based on Mamegoma, revolving around 'Mameta' the Shiro-goma and some other seals going by Soda-kun, Cherry-chan, Candy-chan, Samantha-chan, Daigorou-kun, and Lemon-chan.

Four Nintendo DS games have been released in Japan featuring Mamegoma: Mamegoma: Honobono Nikki (:ja:まめゴマほのぼの日記), Mamegoma 2: Uchi no Ko ga Ichiban!, Qupu!! Mamegoma!, and Mamegoma 3: Kawaii ga Ippai!. Two 3DS games featuring Mamegoma have been added: "Mamegoma: Yoiko Maruko Genkinako!" and "Mamegoma: Happy Sweets Farm".

Several Mamegoma-themed picture books have also been released in Japan.

References

External links
San-X's official site 

San-X characters
Fictional pinnipeds
2009 anime television series debuts
TMS Entertainment